Leionema elatius, commonly known as tall phebalium,  is a shrub species that is endemic to  New South Wales and Queensland in Australia. It has glossy green, variably-shaped leaves and clusters of white-lemon flowers in spring.

Description
The inflorescences are at the end of branches crowded by the leaves, pedicels and peduncles both slim. The calyx lobes are wide-triangular shaped and fleshy. Flowering occurs in spring.

Taxonomy and naming
Tall phebalium was first formally described in 1859 by Ferdinand von Mueller, who gave it the name Eriostemon elatior in Fragmenta phytographiae Australiae from specimens collected near Tenterfield. In 1998, Paul G. Wilson changed the name to Leionema elatius and the change was published in the journal Nuytsia. The specific epithet (elatius) is derived from the Latin meaning "taller".

Wilson described two subspecies and the names are accepted by the Australian Plant Census:
This subspecies has a restricted distribution in the McPherson Range Queensland and north east New South Wales.
This subspecies grows in the ranges in north eastern New South Wales, north of Bulahdelah.

Distribution and habitat
Leionema elatius grows mostly on the ranges north of Bulahdelah and far south-eastern areas of Queensland.

References

External links

elatius
Sapindales of Australia
Flora of New South Wales
Flora of Queensland
Taxa named by Ferdinand von Mueller
Plants described in 1859